Bret Hadley "Epic" Mazur (born August 31, 1970) is an American vocalist, rapper, and record producer. He is best known as a founder and former frontman of the rap rock band Crazy Town.

Early life
Bret Mazur grew up in Brooklyn, New York before his parents moved across the country to Hollywood, Los Angeles. It was here that he began to work as a DJ at age 16, and received the pseudonym "Epic" from a friend. Mazur graduated from William Howard Taft High School in Los Angeles. He then collaborated with Richard Wolf as part of the production team Wolf & Epic on albums by Sheena Easton, Bell Biv DeVoe, Ralph Tresvant, MC Lyte and MC Serch, among others.

Crazy Town
Crazy Town was formed by Mazur and Seth Binzer, who started collaborating in 1995 under the initial name of "The Brimstone Sluggers". By early 1999, they were calling themselves Crazy Town, and the full band consisted of Mazur, Binzer, Rust Epique, James Bradley Jr., Doug Miller, DJ AM, and Antonio Lorenzo "Trouble" Valli. Their debut album, The Gift of Game, was released in November 1999, having been recorded earlier that year. It would become a major success after their single Butterfly reached No. 1 on the Billboard Hot 100, sparking record sales in excess of 1.5 million. Their 2002 follow up album, Darkhorse, was a commercial failure in comparison, and the band broke up shortly after its release.

Crazy Town announced they had reformed in 2007, and Mazur stated that Crazy Town's third album, tentatively titled Crazy Town Is Back, would be released right after his upcoming solo album, Strip to This in Spring 2008. Neither album was released, though Crazy Town did release a third studio album, The Brimstone Sluggers, in 2015. Following a year of hiatus from the group, Mazur announced in January 2017 through Facebook that he will no longer tour with the band.

Record producer
Mazur was included as a producer for New Edition side project, Bell Biv DeVoe.

Feature films and television
In 2014 Mazur became the music and audio department head for Sugar Studios LA. 
 
Mazur scores and sound designs feature films. He worked on the 2018 film The Oath.

Personal life
Mazur has one son named Max, who was born in 1996, and his cousin is actress Monet Mazur. He is of Jewish ancestry.

References

External links
Bret Mazur on Instagram
Official Website
Sugar Studios LA

1970 births
Living people
Nu metal singers
Musicians from Brooklyn
Jewish American musicians
Jewish rappers
Jewish hip hop record producers
Jewish heavy metal musicians
William Howard Taft Charter High School alumni
21st-century American Jews